Hermann Geibel (14 May 1889 – 20 September 1972) was a German sculptor. His work was part of the sculpture event in the art competition at the 1936 Summer Olympics.

References

1889 births
1972 deaths
20th-century German sculptors
20th-century German male artists
German male sculptors
Olympic competitors in art competitions
Artists from Freiburg im Breisgau